KFNV-FM (107.1 FM, "The River") is a radio station broadcasting a classic hits music format. Licensed to Ferriday, Louisiana, United States, the station is owned by James Allgood, through licensee Miss-Lou Media, LLC, and is operated by Miss-Lou Media and their sister-company, Mid-South Broadcasting.

On April 15, 2017, KFNV-FM changed their format from adult contemporary (branded as "The River") to classic hits, branded as "107.1 The Bridge".

As of 2020 under its new ownership of Miss-Lou Media, the station continues to focus mainly on classic hits and rock, but re-introduced "The River" branding seen prior to the format-change.

References

External links

Radio stations in Louisiana
Classic hits radio stations in the United States
Radio stations established in 1972